Dynamite is the third and last collaborative album between labelmates The Supremes and The Four Tops, released on the Motown label in 1971. The album was a collection of material recorded for the Magnificent Seven albums, but which had not been included on either of those two albums. The cover artwork was an illustration based on photo sessions from the Return of the Magnificent Seven album artwork. In the US, Dynamite was as commercially unsuccessful as The Magnificent 7 (1970) and The Return of the Magnificent Seven (1971), peaking at the lower hundreds of the Billboard Top 200. The album fared much better on the Billboard R&B charts, peaking at 21.

It includes several covers of previous hits and a few Motown originals. It opens with "It's Impossible", which had been a hit in Spanish as "Somos novios", for its composer Armando Manzanero, and later successfully covered by  Perry Como and R&B group New Birth. Two of the cuts, "Hello Stranger" and "Love the One You're With", had also been hits for their composers, respectively Barbara Lewis and  Stephen Stills, while the group Bread reached the top of the Easy Listening chart with "If", and both Aretha Franklin and The Ones had moderate successes with Franklin's composition "Don't Let Me Lose This Dream". Of the Motown material the album producers chose two mild hits by Marvin Gaye and Tammi Terrell, "If I Could Build My Whole World Around You" and "Good Lovin' Ain't Easy to Come By"; "Do You Love Me Just a Little, Honey", a song co-written by  Gladys Knight, Johnny Bristol, Harvey Fuqua and Vernon Bullock; plus two compositions by Mel Larson and Jerry Marcellino: "Melodie", which had been recorded the same year by Bobby Darin, and  "The Bigger You Love (The Harder You Fall)".

No singles were picked up in the United States, but one of the favorite original compositions, "Melodie" (with "Good Lovin' Ain't Easy to Come By" on the flip side), was released in New Zealand. A year later, the Four Tops parted from Motown to sign with ABC Records (today, the catalogs of both ABC and Motown are owned by Universal Music Group).

Track listing

Side One
"It's Impossible" (Armando Manzanero, Sid Wayne)
Produced by Frank Wilson and Bobby Taylor
"The Bigger You Love (The Harder You Fall)" (Jerry Marcellino, Mel Larson)
Produced by Frank Wilson and Bobby Taylor
"Hello Stranger" (Barbara Lewis)
Produced by Frank Wilson and Bobby Taylor 
"Love the One You're With" (Stephen Stills)
Produced by Frank Wilson and Bobby Taylor 
"Good Lovin' Ain't Easy to Come By" (Nickolas Ashford, Valerie Simpson)
Produced by Bobby Taylor

Side Two
"Melodie" (Deke Richards, Jerry Marcellino, Mel Larson)
Produced by Frank Wilson and Bobby Taylor 
"If" (David Gates)
Produced by Bobby Taylor 
"If I Could Build My Whole World Around You" (Harvey Fuqua, Johnny Bristol, Vernon Bullock)
Produced by Johnny Bristol
"Don't Let Me Lose This Dream" (Aretha Franklin, Ted White)
Produced by Joe Hinton
"Do You Love Me Just a Little, Honey" (Gladys Knight, Harvey Fuqua, Johnny Bristol, Vernon Bullock)
Produced by Johnny Bristol

Personnel
The Supremes (Jean Terrell, Mary Wilson, Cindy Birdsong), The Four Tops (Levi Stubbs, Duke Fakir, Obie Benson, Lawrence Payton) - vocals
David Van DePitte, Gene Page, H.B. Barnum, Robert White - arrangers
The Funk Brothers - instrumentation
Curtis McNair - art direction
Warren Linn - illustration
Tom Schlesinger - graphics

Chart history

References

1971 albums
Covers albums
The Supremes albums
Four Tops albums
Collaborative albums
Albums arranged by H. B. Barnum
Albums arranged by Gene Page
Albums produced by Frank Wilson (musician)
Motown albums